Kiomoni is an administrative ward in Tanga District of Tanga Region in Tanzania. 
According to the 2012 census, the ward has a total population of 6,587. The ward is home to the Amboni Caves and also the largest limestone mine in the country.

References

Wards of Tanga Region